The Person and the Challenges is a biannual peer-reviewed academic journal that was established in 2011. It is published by the Pontifical University of John Paul II in Cracow, Faculty of Theology, Section in Tarnów. The focus of the journal is the international exchange of ideas, evaluations, reports and studies on the person and contemporary challenges and the human dignity in the field of theology, education, canon law and social studies.
The founder and current editor-in-chief is Józef Stala. Articles are in German, English, French, Italian and Spanish.

See also 
 List of theological journals

External links 
 
 Library of the University of Regensburg, Germany

References

Religious studies journals
Publications established in 2011
Multilingual journals
Biannual journals